Jon-John Robinson (born April 22, 1970) is an American record producer and songwriter who specializes in R&B, pop and hip-hop music.

Career 
Robinson is a two-time Grammy award-winning, multi-platinum producer and a voting member of the Recording Academy. He signed his first publishing/production deal with former wife of Babyface, Tracey Edmonds.  He has worked with many artists from TLC to Diana Ross.

Robinson formed an independent record label company, which mainly focuses on developing producers, artists and releasing digital media. He signed hip-hop artist K. Jackson, who was a former member of teen R&B group 3rd Storee, and actor from the television series Everybody Hates Chris. He released K. Jackson's first mix tape Beach House, and released Jackson's first single "Candy Man" on iTunes.

Production discography

References

External links 

 at Artist Direct

 at Spud Too Tight

Living people
African-American record producers
Record producers from California
1970 births
21st-century African-American people
20th-century African-American people